Gwen Teirbron (French: Blanche; Latin: Alba Trimammis or Candida; possibly English: Wite) was a Breton holy woman and wife of Fragan who supposedly lived in the 5th or 6th century. Her epithet is Welsh for '(of the) three breasts'.

Veneration
Popular devotion interpreted Gwen's unusual physical and spiritual fecundity by God's gift to her of a third breast. Her iconography followed suit. Gwen is invoked for women's fertility. She is commemorated on 3 October in the Catholic Church (although this has been transferred from Saint Candidus of Rome), and on 18 July (NS) by the Russian Orthodox Church Abroad in Australia.

Possible identification
She is interpreted by Dyfed Lloyd Evans as having been a euhemerized mother goddess.

Children
Winwaloe, son of Prince Fragan (or Fracan) and Teirbron
Jacut (or James), son of Prince Fragan and Teirbron
Wethenoc (or Gwethenoc or Guethenoc), son of Prince Fragan and Teirbron
Creirwy (or Creirvy), daughter of Prince Fragan and Teirbron
Cadfan, son of Eneas Ledewig (or Aeneas of Brittany) and Teirbron

References

Southwestern Brythonic saints
Welsh mythology
6th-century Christian saints
Medieval Breton saints
Female saints of medieval Wales